Gheimeh or Qeimeh is an Iranian stew (khoresh) consisting of diced mutton, tomatoes, split peas, onion and dried lime, garnished with golden thinly sliced crispy potatoes. The stew is sometimes garnished with fried eggplant and is usually served with white rice (polow).

Etymology
The Persian word gheimeh (also transliterated as qeimeh) derives from Classical Persian qeema which comes from a Turkic word qıyma 'minced meat', like the Urdu qīmā/keema, Turkish kıyma and Greek kimás.

Iraqi variant 

Iraqi qeema is made with finely diced meat and crushed split peas, and is prepared on a large communal scale at the annual Āshūrā commemorations.

Iranian variants
 Gheimeh sibzamini: with thin-cut French fries.
 Gheimeh bademjan: with pan-fried whole or long-cut eggplants.
 Gheimeh nesar: with almonds and fried onions; a specialty of Qazvin.
 Pichagh gheimeh: a different dish with almonds and fried onions; a specialty of Ardabil. Pichagh (Azeri spelling pıçaq) means knife in the Azerbaijani language and it refers to the almonds.
 Gheimeh rashti: with sour pomegranate paste, pomegranate juice, tomato and verjuice; a specialty of Rasht.
 Gheimeh nokhoud: with chickpeas instead of split peas; a specialty of the Persian Gulf coast of Iran; similar to abgoosht.
 Gheimeh kadou: with pan-fried whole or long-cut squash.
 Gheimeh beh: with pan-fried whole or long cut quinces.
 Gheimeh bamieh: with pan-fried okras. It also has lemon juice and cinnamon.

See also
 Khoresht
 List of lamb dishes
 List of stews

References

Iranian stews
Iraqi cuisine
Lamb dishes